Port Pirie Airport  is an airport that is located  south of Port Pirie, South Australia, Australia. The airport is owned by the Port Pirie Regional Council.

History
The airfield was a Royal Australian Air Force (RAAF) station and home to No. 2 Bombing and Gunnery School (No. 2 BAGS) during World War II. No. 2 BAGS provided bombing and gunnery training for pilots, air observers and air gunners. No. 2 Operational Training Unit was formed at Port Pirie on 6 April 1942, and operated initially with Wirraways and Fairey Battles at the aerodrome until it moved to Mildura, Victoria in May 1942. No. 2 BAGS was renamed No. 3 Air Observers School in December 1943. After World War II, the station housed No. 5 Central Recovery Depot where aircraft and parts were stored until disposal. The station closed in early 1947, with the aerodrome reverting to civilian use thereafter. A Bellman hangar is still standing at the airport and is in good condition, it remains in use by light aircraft based at the airport.

See also
 List of airports in South Australia

References

Airports in South Australia
Former Royal Australian Air Force bases
Buildings and structures in Port Pirie